John Meaney (born 1957 in London) is a British science fiction author.

Biography
Meaney grew up in London and Slough, England with his brother Colm (who is not the same as the Star Trek actor Colm Meaney). He has studied martial arts since childhood and has a black belt in shotokan karate. Meaney originally studied at Birmingham University and holds a combined degree in Physics and Computer Science from the Open University. He has done postgraduate work at Oxford University and is a part-time IT consultant.

Writing career
Meaney's science fiction began appearing in 1992 with "Spring Rain" in the July 1992 issue of Interzone. He has published over a dozen short pieces as of 2006. His novelette "Sharp Tang" was shortlisted for the British Science Fiction Association Award in 1995. His first and second novels, To Hold Infinity and Paradox, were on the BSFA shortlists for Best Novel in 1999 and 2001. To Hold Infinity was also selected as one of the Daily Telegraph'''s "Books of the Year" . He lives in Kent with his wife Yvonne.

Works

 To Hold Infinity (Bantam/Transworld, 1998)

Nulapeiron Sequence
 Paradox (Bantam/Transworld, 2000)
 Context (Bantam/Transworld, 2002)
 Resolution (Bantam/Transworld, 2005)

Tristopolis
 Bone Song (Gollancz/Orion, 2007)
 Dark Blood (Gollancz/Orion, 2008) - released as Black Blood in the US in 2009
 Tristopolis Requiem (Self published, 2018)

Ragnarok
 Absorption (Gollancz/Orion, 2010)
 Transmission (Gollancz/Orion, 2012)
 Resonance (Gollancz/Orion, 2013)

Writing as Thomas Blackthorne
 Edge (Angry Robot, 2010)
 Point'' (Angry Robot, 2011)

External links
 John Meaney's Web site
 
 2002 Sfsite.com interview with John Meaney
 John Meaney fan page
 Meaney's 2003 Phoenix Convention profile

1957 births
Living people
British science fiction writers
English science fiction writers
Alumni of the Open University
English male novelists
English male non-fiction writers